Pristimantis paululus is a species of frog in the family Strabomantidae.
It is found in Ecuador, possibly Colombia, and possibly Peru.
Its natural habitat is tropical moist lowland forests.
It is threatened by habitat loss.

References

paululus
Amphibians of Ecuador
Endemic fauna of Ecuador
Amphibians described in 1974
Taxonomy articles created by Polbot